Nationality words link to articles with information on the nation's poetry or literature (for instance, Irish or France).

Events

 The period from September 1818 to September of this year is often referred to among scholars of John Keats as "the Great Year", or "the Living Year", because during this period he is most productive, writing his most critically acclaimed works. Several major events have been noted as factors in this increased productivity: namely, the death of his brother Tom (December 1818), the critical reviews of Endymion (1818), and his meeting Fanny Brawne (November 1818), to whom he proposes marriage on October 19. He has been inspired by a series of recent lectures by Hazlitt on English poets and poetic identity and has also met Wordsworth. Having given up work at Guy's Hospital and taken up residence at a new house, Wentworth Place, on Hampstead Heath on the edge of London, between April 21 and the end of May he writes the ballad La Belle Dame sans Merci and most of his major odes: Ode to Psyche, Ode on a Grecian Urn, Ode to a Nightingale, Ode on Indolence and Ode on Melancholy. In the summer he writes Lamia and on September 19 he writes his ode To Autumn at Winchester.
 Percy Bysshe Shelley, in Italy, also has one of his most productive years. He writes The Masque of Anarchy in reaction to the Peterloo Massacre of August 16 (news of which reaches him on September 5) and sends it to a newspaper (although it is not published until 1832, after his death, with a preface by Leigh Hunt), also writing the political sonnet England in 1819 (published 1839), Ode to the West Wind (published 1820), The Cenci: A Tragedy, in Five Acts (a verse drama, printed in Italy) and Julian and Maddalo (published in his Posthumous Poems of 1824).
 Konstantin Batyushkov ends his time as a secretary to the Russian diplomatic mission at Naples and writes some of his last poems before his mental breakdown, notably "You awake, oh Bayya, from the tomb..." («Ты пробуждаешься, о Байя, из гробницы...»).
 William Wordsworth begins another major revision of The Prelude. This version is completed in 1820. His first version, in two parts, was done in 1798 and 1799. A second major revision occurred in 1805 and 1806. The book is not published in any form until shortly after his death in 1850.

Works published in English

 Charles Bucke, The Fall of the Leaf, and Other Poems
Lord Byron:
 June 28: Mazeppa and "Ode on Venice" published
 "Wellington: The Best of the Cut-Throats", a poem attacking Lord Wellington
 July: Don Juan, cantos i, ii, published anonymously; other versions published 1821, 1823 and 1824
Thomas Campbell, Specimens of the British Poets, an anthology
 Louisa Costello, Redwald: A Tale of Mona; and Other Poems
 George Crabbe, Tales of the Hall, the author's last work
 Charles Dibdin, Young Arthur; or, The Child of Mystery
 Felicia Dorothea Hemans:
 Tales and Historic Scenes, in Verse
 Wallace's Invocation to Bruce
 William Hone, the Political House that Jack Built, published anonymously; illustrated by George Cruikshank
Leigh Hunt:
 "Hero and Leander"
 "Bacchies"
 "Ariadne"
 Poetical Works including reprints of "Bacchies", "Ariadne", The Story of Rimini and "The Descent of Liberty"
John Keats, Odes
 Lady Caroline Lamb, Verses from Glenarvon, published anonymously
 Charles Lloyd, Nugae Canorae
 Thomas Babington Macaulay, Pompeii
 James Montgomery, Greenland, and Other Poems
 Thomas Moore, Tom Crib's Memorial to Congress
 Bryan Waller Proctor writing as "Barry Cornwall", Dramatic Scenes, and Other Poems
 J. H. Reynolds, Peter Bell: A lyrical ballad, writing under the pen name "W. W.", that is, satirically purporting to be William Wordsworth; a parody of Wordsworth's "Peter Bell" (see below)
 Samuel Rogers, Human Life
Percy Bysshe Shelley:
 The Cenci: A tragedy, not performed until May 7, 1886
 Julian and Maddalo
 Rosalind and Helen: a Modern Eclogue; with Other Poems
William Wordsworth:
Peter Bell: A tale in verse, parodied in advance of publication by Reynolds (see above) and later by P.B. Shelley in "Peter Bell the Third"
 The Waggoner

United States
 The American Ladies Pocket Book: 1819, including poetry by St. George Tucker, Philadelphia: A. Small, anthology
 Joseph Rodman Drake and Fitz-Greene Halleck, writing anonymously, "The Croaker Papers", a series of 35 poems in the New York Evening Post and National Advertiser, with 14 by Drake and eight written in collaboration between the two poets; light, satirical criticisms, often of local politicians; Edgar Allan Poe later criticized them, calling them ephemeral and careless
 Fitz-Greene Halleck, Fanny, a long poem, much praised for its social commentary; about a poor merchant and his daughter rising into high society; written in the style of Beppo by Lord Byron; two years later, Halleck added 50 stanzas to the popular poem
 John Neal:
 Otho: A Tragedy, in Five Acts, Boston: West, Richardson and Lord
The Battle of Niagara: Second Edition, Enlarged, with Other Poems
 Thomas Paine, Miscellaneous Poems
 James Kirke Paulding, The Lay of the Scottish Fiddle: a Tale of Havre de Grace, Supposed to be written By Walter Scott, Esq. New York; Philadelphia: Published by Inskeep & Bradford, and Bradford & Inskeep
 John Howard Payne, Brutus; or, The Fall of Tarquin. An Historical Tragedy in Five Acts, London: T. Rodwell
 Gulian Crommelin Verplanck, The State Triumvirate, seven satires originally published in the New York American newspaper which he co-founded; the extremely popular work, praised by critics, attacked New York Governor DeWitt Clinton and his administration
 Richard Henry Wilde, The Lament of the Captive, an epic on the Seminole War, includes the much-praised lyric "My Life Is Like the Summer Rose", which was reprinted nationwide, unattributed and without the author's consent

Other in English
 Barron Field, First Fruits of Australian Poetry, first book of poetry published in Australia

Works published in other languages

France
 Honoré de Balzac, Cromwell
 André Chénier:
 La Jeune Tarentine ("The Young Tarentine")
 La Jeune Captive ("The Young Captive")
 Marceline Desbordes-Valmore, Élégies et romances, France
 Louis Jean Népomucène Lemercier, La Panhypocrisiade, ou la comédie infernale du seizième siècle ("The Panhypocrisiade, or The Infernal Comedy of the Sixteenth Century"), in sixteen cantos

Other languages
 Johann Wolfgang von Goethe, West-östlicher Divan ("West-Eastern Diwan"), Germany
 Kobayashi Issa, Oraga haru ("The Year of My Life"), Japan

Births
Death years link to the corresponding "[year] in poetry" article:
 January 1 - Arthur Hugh Clough (died 1861), English poet and brother of suffragist Anne Jemima Clough
 January 21 - Edward Capern (died 1894), English postman poet
 February 3 - Amelia B. Coppuck Welby (died 1852), American fugitive poet
 February 12 - William Wetmore Story (died 1895, American sculptor, art critic, poet and editor
 February 22 - James Russell Lowell (died 1891), American
 May 27 - Julia Ward Howe (died 1910), American poet and abolitionist
 May 31 - Walt Whitman (died 1892), American
 June 12 - Charles Kingsley (died 1875), English writer and cleric
 June 29 - Thomas Dunn English (died 1902), American politician and poet
 July 24 - Josiah Gilbert Holland (died 1881), American novelist and poet
 August 1 - Herman Melville (died 1891), American novelist and poet
 August 30 - Carlo Favetti (died 1892), Friulian politician and poet
 November 22 - George Eliot, born Mary Ann Evans (died 1880), English novelist and writer
 December 30 - Theodor Fontane (died 1898), German novelist and poet

Deaths
Birth years link to the corresponding "[year] in poetry" article:
 January 14 - John Wolcot (born 1738), English satirist and poet
 January 18 - Valentin Vodnik (born 1758), Carniolan Slovene poet, writer and priest
 January 28 - Johann Karl Wezel (also "Carl"; born 1747), German poet, writer and educator
 February 25 - Francisco Manoel de Nascimento (born 1734), Portuguese
 December 2 - James Wallis Eastburn (born 1797), American
 date not known - Wang Yun (born 1749), Chinese poet and playwright during the Qing dynasty

See also

 Poetry
 List of years in poetry
 List of years in literature
 19th century in literature
 19th century in poetry
 Romantic poetry
 Golden Age of Russian Poetry (1800–1850)
 Weimar Classicism period in Germany, commonly considered to have begun in 1788  and to have ended either in 1805, with the death of Friedrich Schiller, or 1832, with the death of Goethe
 List of poets

Notes

Poetry
19th-century poetry